Chatta Singh VC (188628 March 1961) was an Indian recipient of the Victoria Cross, the highest and most prestigious award for gallantry in the face of the enemy that can be awarded to British and Commonwealth forces.

Details
He was about 29 years old, and a Sepoy in the 9th Bhopal Infantry, British Indian Army during the First World War when he performed the deed for which he was awarded the VC. On 13 January 1916 during the Battle of the Wadi, Mesopotamia, Sepoy Chatta Singh left cover to assist and to rescue his commanding officer, who was lying wounded and helpless in the open.

The citation reads:

The Governor-General of India, Lord Chelmsford, at a special parade on Tuesday, 30 January 1917, at the vice-regal lodge, Delhi, India, presented medals and orders to 200 Indian officers and men including the Victoria Cross to Sepoy Chatta Singh, 9th Bhopal Infantry, and two other Indian soldiers.

He later rose to the rank of Havildar.

The Medal 
A contemporary copy of the Victoria Cross, which is believed to have been presented to Sepoy Chatta Singh 'in the field' on 8 March 1916, was sold by Dix Noonan Web on 22 September 2006.

References 

Burial location

Indian World War I recipients of the Victoria Cross
British Indian Army soldiers
1886 births
1961 deaths
People from Kanpur Dehat district